The Streetsweeper, Vol. 2 is the second studio album by American DJ, DJ Kay Slay, released on March 30, 2004, through Columbia Records.

Background
The album was the follow-up to Kay Slay's The Streetsweeper, Vol. 1 released the previous year.

Production
This album followed the same format as the last, several of hip-hop's biggest artists, including 50 Cent and Eminem, perform songs produced by prominent hip hop producers ranging from Swizz Beatz to Kanye West. Kay Slay himself does not rap on nor produce any of the songs, rather he serves as the executive producer and ad-libs on some of the songs.

Track listing

Notes
 signifies an additional producer.
"Hands on the Pump" contains interpolations from "The Breakdown" by Rufus Thomas.
"Not Your Average Joe" contains interpolations from "Ain't Nobody" by Rufus & Chaka Khan.

Samples
"Don't Stop the Music" samples "Don't Stop The Music" by Yarbrough & Peoples.
"Who Gives A Fuck Where You From" contains a sample from "Transformers (Original Version)" by Anne Bryant.
"Through Your Head" contains samples from "Didn't I (Blow Your Mind This Time)" by Regina Belle.
"Celebrity Love" contains interpolations from the composition "Let's Do It Again" written by Curtis Mayfield.

Chart history

References

2004 albums
Columbia Records albums
DJ Kay Slay albums
Albums produced by Mr. Porter
Albums produced by Clark Kent (producer)
Albums produced by the Heatmakerz
Albums produced by Kanye West
Albums produced by Eminem
Albums produced by Swizz Beatz
Sequel albums